Ascend: Hand of Kul (formerly Ascend: New Gods) was a 2013 free-to-play, character-action MMORPG game for the Xbox 360 and Microsoft Windows. It was unveiled at the Electronic Entertainment Expo 2012 during Microsoft's press conference. Though the beta version was available in the Xbox Live Arcade for free to Gold members, the game never saw full release. On August 18, 2014, the game was delisted from the Xbox marketplace. On August 21, 2014, it was announced the game's server will be closing November 18, 2014. The PC version was shut down on June 20, 2016. 

On December 1st, 2022, a small team by the name of Outer Heaven Game Studios released Ascend: Reborn for PC on Steam, again as a free-to-play game. 

As of one month after release, the game maintains an average concurrent player count of fewer than a hundred players.

Plot
The main character in Ascend: Hand of Kul is a member of the Caos, a race of warriors. The player serves gods, pledging allegiance to one of the Three Gods (darkness, light, and void) and helping their chosen god rule over the world. The goal is to defeat the Titans. The Titans are large, immortal giants that were once gods who had physically manifested and became increasingly corrupted as a result, eventually losing their sanity and becoming incapable of returning to the spirit world.

Gameplay
The player controls a Caos, an entity shown to be massive in relation to humans. Despite their large size, Caos are very fast, and utilizing buffs in-game, one can capitalize on their speed or their raw power. The general gameplay flow follows a linear progression path, which unlocks key game mechanics and tutorializes the player while giving exposition on the game's world. 

The game more closely resembles a hack-and-slash character-action game while playing it than an MMO, as the multiplayer mechanics are tuned for the Xbox 360 and its capabilities. Further development may have expanded the multiplayer features.

Primarily, you do combat with similarly-sized creatures and other Caos in order to serve the Light or the Dark - warring factions that offer the player unique buffs and aesthetics. A combination of standing, dashing, and running melee options are available for attacking and retreating strategies, in addition to spells and special abilities.

New equipment for the player character can be found throughout the game and offers the freedom to customize one's play style, within limitations. The balance of attack speed and attack damage is the primary mathematical "metagame" which one would focus on in order to optimize damage output, with passive or active buffs of the player playing a more supplementary role. As one progresses, the found equipment is typically stronger than in previous sections of the game, and is necessary to upgrading a character. Stronger enemies will present an unreasonable challenge if one does not continue to upgrade their gear, 

However, the movement options available to the player facilitate playing without too much regard to the statistics of combat; There are a number of "animation cancels" possible which vastly improve attack rate. This creates a uniquely-feeling combat flow, but is otherwise unanswered by the enemy design. There are Player vs Player combat modes in which this "tech" could be realized.

The game features parallel multiplayer, wherein the player proceeds on a single-player adventure, but can see other players going about their single-player adventures at the same time. The player cannot work together as in traditional co-op modes, but can purchase and send "blessings" and "curses" to one another. Curses summon monsters into the targeted player's realm, and players are rewarded if their target is defeated. Blessings send buffs to targeted players.

Development
The title was developed by Signal Studios. The developer previously created Toy Soldiers, a game for Xbox Live Arcade. A re-release of the game was done by Outer Heavens Game Studios.

Reception
The original reception of Ascend: Hand of Kul is tenuous; aside from a small number of critic opinions, the game seemed to be received generally well, but its biggest issues seem to be shared with other MMOs on consoles. As it was released on Xbox 360 exclusively until 2014, there were no viable communication alternatives, which are critical for games within the genre, for players to interact. Generally, one would want to type out a message in a seamless fashion in-game to another in order to communicate. On the Xbox 360, however, you are only able to use its integrated messaging and recent player discovery features, which, in a genre where you're often typing hundreds to thousands of words daily to friends and party members, results in quite cumbersome player interactions. This is likely to have resulted in the early demise of the game, as development had not expanded upon player interactions.

The reception for Ascend: Reborn stands at roughly 75% positive on Steam and is the most representative metric available as of Jan. 2023. Reviews are generally positive for its abundance of free content and faithfulness to the original. However, the criticism comes in with the use of microtransactions and arbitrary anti-farming paywalls, according to Steam reviews.

References

External links
 

2013 video games
Microsoft games
Online-only games
Role-playing video games
Video games developed in the United States
Windows games
Windows Phone games
Xbox 360 Live Arcade games
Xbox 360 games
Multiplayer and single-player video games